Bacchisa parvula is a species of beetle in the family Cerambycidae. It was described by Schwarzer in 1926. It is known from Sumatra.

References

P
Beetles described in 1926